Touch Sensitive may refer to:

 Touch Sensitive (album), a 1984 album by Bruce Foxton
 Touch Sensitive... Bootleg Box Set, five disc live box set by The Fall
 Touch Sensitive, an album by Mackey Feary 1984
 Touch Sensitive (producer), a solo project of Michael Di Francesco

See also
 Touch sensitivity or mechanoreception